Jaime Ignacio González González (born 19 October 1960 Madrid, Spain) is a Spanish politician and member of the Partido Popular. González served as the President of the Community of Madrid, one of the seventeen autonomous communities of Spain, from 26 September 2012 to June 2015.

Political career 
González´ predecessor, Esperanza Aguirre, resigned from office in September 2012 citing declining health.
González held his first official meeting with Prime Minister Mariano Rajoy at Moncloa Palace on 15 October 2012, two weeks after taking office as President of the Community.  González continued to be involved with running the public water company Canal de Isabel II.

Investigations 
Since 2016 the Justice investigates the relationship between the politician, the former Worker Minister and businessmen linked to politics. As a result of these investigations known as Operación Lezo, González was arrested on corruption charges on 19 April 2017. He was held on remand from April to November 2017 at Soto del Real prison.

References

External links

1960 births
Presidents of the Community of Madrid
People's Party (Spain) politicians
Living people
People named in the Panama Papers
Spanish prisoners and detainees
Members of the 9th Assembly of Madrid
Members of the 8th Assembly of Madrid
Government ministers of the Community of Madrid
Members of the People's Parliamentary Group (Assembly of Madrid)

gl:Ignacio González